|}

The Fairway Stakes is a Listed flat horse race in Great Britain open to three-year-old horses. It is run over a distance of 1 mile and 2 furlongs (2,012 metres) on the Rowley Mile at Newmarket in May.

History
The event is named after Fairway, a successful Newmarket-trained racehorse in the 1920s. It was established in 1998, and was initially held on the July Course. The first running was won by Royal Anthem.

The Fairway Stakes was switched to the Rowley Mile in 2000.

Records
Leading jockey (4 wins):

 William Buick – Thought Worthy (2012), Old Persian (2018), Volkan Star (2020), John Leeper (2021)

Leading trainer (4 wins):
 Charlie Appleby - Pinzolo (2014), Old Persian (2018), Volkan Star (2020), Ottoman Fleet (2022)

Winners

See also
 Horse racing in Great Britain
 List of British flat horse races

References
 Racing Post:

 pedigreequery.com – Fairway Stakes – Newmarket.

Flat horse races for three-year-olds
Newmarket Racecourse
Flat races in Great Britain
1998 establishments in England
Recurring sporting events established in 1998